Hans Schwegerle (2 May 1882 – 4 September 1950) was a German sculptor. His work was part of the sculpture event in the art competition at the 1928 Summer Olympics.

References

1882 births
1950 deaths
20th-century German sculptors
20th-century German male artists
German male sculptors
Olympic competitors in art competitions
People from Lübeck